The Oak Knoll District of Napa Valley AVA is an American Viticultural Area located within Napa Valley AVA at the southern end of the valley floor. The appellation's close proximity to San Pablo Bay results in a climate that is cooler and more moderate than any region in Napa Valley other than the Los Carneros AVA.  The AVA has more vines planted to it than any other wholly contained appellation within the Napa Valley.  A wide variety of wine grapes do well in this climate, including varieties not widely grown in other parts of Napa Valley, such as Riesling and Pinot noir.  The district is planted largely to Merlot, Chardonnay and Cabernet Sauvignon,  in that order. Oak Knoll District Chardonnay has a reputation for a restrained, delicate style.  The appellation was officially designated an appellation within the Napa Valley AVA on April 26, 2004.

Vineyards in Oak Knoll District
Behrens Family Vineyards,
Bengier Family Vineyards,
Blackbird Vineyards,
Fortunati Vineyards,
Corley Family/Monticello Vineyards,
Kelly Family Vineyards,
Lobos Wines,
O'Brien Estate,
Padis Vineyards,
Robert Biale Vineyards, Silenus Winery
Trefethen Family Vineyards,
Whitehall Lane Vineyards,
Cunat Family Vineyards,
O'Connell Family Vineyards,
Boyd Family Vineyards,
Bartlett Bear Vineyard,
Robert Mueller Vineyards (McKenzie-Mueller Vineyards)
Meadowbrook Farm Vineyard
Cliff Family Winery,
Valle di Sotto Vineyard

References

American Viticultural Areas of the San Francisco Bay Area
Napa Valley
Geography of Napa County, California
2004 establishments in California
American Viticultural Areas